Jesse Hunt (July 3, 1793 – December 8, 1872) was Mayor of Baltimore from November 1832 to August 11, 1835. He resigned office following a banking crisis in which, as a director of the failed bank, he was personally implicated.

Early life
Jesse Hunt was born on July 3, 1793, in Green Spring Valley, Baltimore County, Maryland. He was a descendant of a pioneer family of Calvert County. His father moved from Calvert County to Green Spring Valley in 1760. In 1808, he served as an apprentice at the house of William and Richard Hall, a saddlery in Baltimore.

Career
Hunt enlisted in the volunteer army and helped raise the company Washington Blues, a division attached to the 5th Maryland Regiment and was at the Battle of North Point in 1814 during the War of 1812. He later became a lieutenant and resigned his commission in 1822.

In 1815, Hunt started to work in the saddlery and harness-making business. He was elected to the Maryland House of Delegates in 1829, 1830 and 1831. In 1832, he was nominated for mayor and was elected under the Democratic ticket, defeating Jacob Small. He was re-elected in 1834.

In 1834, the Bank of Maryland, of which Hunt was a director, experienced a liquidity crisis and collapsed. Months passed and creditors grew tired of waiting in vain for a settlement, and violence soon followed. On August 6, 1835, a mob gathered and broke the windows of the house of Reverdy Johnson one of the bank's directors. Jesse attempted to protect his colleague's home, but was unable to prevent the destruction of that and many other bank directors' homes, including - eventually - his own.

Hunt, having lost control of the city, resigned five days later, on August 11, 1835. After resigning, Hunt was elected as City Register and served in that position for ten years. He became the first president of Eutaw Savings Bank and served in that position until 1871.

Personal life
Hunt married Margaret Yundt and she died in 1860. He had seven children. He died on December 8, 1872 at his home in Baltimore. He was buried at Green Mount Cemetery in Baltimore.

See also
Baltimore bank riot

Notes

External links

www.msa.md.gov Retrieved January 2012

1793 births
1872 deaths
Bank riot
Finance fraud
Members of the Maryland House of Delegates
Mayors of Baltimore
People from Maryland in the War of 1812
Burials at Green Mount Cemetery